Alan C. Miller (born March 5, 1954) is a Pulitzer Prize-winning American journalist and the founder of the News Literacy Project, a national education nonprofit that works with educators and journalists to offer resources and tools that help middle school and high school students learn to separate fact from fiction. In 2020, NLP expanded its audience to include people of all ages.

Early life
Born in New York City to Martin and Anita Miller (urbanist), Miller was raised in Ridgewood, New Jersey. In 1976, he received a bachelor's degree in English from Wesleyan University, where he was a member of Phi Beta Kappa. Wesleyan considers him one of its "notable alumni." He received a master's degree in political science in 1978 from the University of Hawaii and was a student participant at the East-West Center's Communication Institute. During his post-graduate studies he was an intern in the Tokyo bureau of The Washington Post.

Career 
Miller was a reporter for The Times Union in Albany, New York, and The Record in Hackensack, New Jersey, before joining the Los Angeles Times in 1987. Seven years later he became a member of the Times' investigative team in Washington. During his career, he received more than a dozen national journalism awards, including for reports on illegal foreign contributions to Democratic candidates (the 1996 George Polk Award, the 1997 National Headliner Award for Investigative Reporting and the 1997 Goldsmith Prize for Investigative Reporting) and for "The Vertical Vision," a series, written with Kevin Sack, about the dangers of the Marine Corps' McDonnell Douglas AV-8B Harrier II jet (the 2002 Investigative Reporters and Editors Medal, the 2003 Pulitzer Prize for National Reporting and the 2003 Associated Press Managing Editors Association Public Service Award).

In 2006, he was invited to tell the sixth-grade classes at his daughter's school in Bethesda, Maryland, about his work as a journalist. The 175 thank-you notes he received led him to consider the impact that journalists could have in the classroom. Two years later he left the Times and founded the News Literacy Project.

Miller has served on the advisory board of Stony Brook University's Center for News Literacy and the board of the American Society of News Editors. He was a fellow at the Japan Society in 1998 and the Peter Jennings Project at the National Constitution Center in 2008. He has spoken at a number of colleges and universities and has appeared on panels sponsored by the Knight Commission on the Information Needs of Communities in a Democracy, Investigative Reporters and Editors, the International Center for Journalists, the National Endowment for Democracy, and Harvard University's Shorenstein Center on the Press, Politics and Public Policy.

Washingtonian magazine named him a Washingtonian of the Year in December 2020. In October 2021 he was named one of five recipients of the 2022 AARP Purpose Prize, awarded to people age 50 and older "who use their knowledge and life experience to solve challenging social problems." The East-West Center presented him with its Distinguished Alumni Award in June 2022.

Miller retired as CEO of the News Literacy Project on June 30, 2022.

Journalism awards
1981 New York State Publishers State Government Coverage Award of Excellence
1996 George Polk Award for Political Reporting, Los Angeles Times, "Money From Asia"
1997 National Headliner Award for Investigative Reporting, Los Angeles Times, "Money From Asia"
1997 Goldsmith Prize for Investigative Reporting, Los Angeles Times, "Illegal Democratic Campaign Contributions"
2002 Investigative Reporters and Editors Medal, "The Vertical Vision"
2003 Pulitzer Prize for National Reporting, "The Vertical Vision"
2003 Associated Press Managing Editors Association Public Service Award
2005 (second place) John B. Oakes Award for Distinguished Environmental Journalism, "Environmental Politics"
2008 National Press Club Consumer Journalism Award, "Danger in Tow"
2008 National Headliner Award for Investigative Reporting (third place), "Danger in Tow"

References

American male journalists
Wesleyan University alumni
George Polk Award recipients
Pulitzer Prize for National Reporting winners
Living people
Los Angeles Times people
1954 births